Spectrum Sports was a regional sports network serving Texas and owned by Charter Communications through its acquisition of Time Warner Cable in May 2016. It ceased operations in June 2017, with some of its remaining programs migrating to Spectrum News Austin.

Programming
The following sporting were carried by Spectrum Sports (Texas):
TAPPS high school games weekly (football, soccer, basketball, volleyball, baseball, softball; Fridays live)
UIL football (Thursdays live, Friday & Saturday tape delayed, post-season live)
UTRGV basketball and baseball
Dallas Sidekicks indoor soccer
UTSA Roadrunners basketball (select)
SMU Mustangs basketball (select)
Southland Conference basketball (Lamar, Incarnate Word, Texas A&M–Corpus Christi, etc.) (select)
Dr. Pepper Dallas Cup
Texas State Bobcats football, basketball, and baseball
Allen Americans hockey

Other shows that aired on Spectrum Sports:
Raceline
Future Phenoms
Sled Head
Torc Unleased
Xtream Racing
FC Dallas MLS soccer (simulcast of TXA 21 outside of Dallas–Fort Worth, primary broadcaster for select games)
Dallas Vigilantes arena football

External links
North Texas
Central Texas

References

Texas
Television channels and stations established in 2010
Television channels and stations disestablished in 2017
Defunct local cable stations in the United States
2010 establishments in Texas
2017 disestablishments in Texas
Defunct mass media in Texas